Lepidium ecuadoriense is a species of flowering plant in the family Brassicaceae. It is found only in Ecuador. Its natural habitat is subtropical or tropical high-altitude grassland. It is threatened by habitat loss.

References

ecuadoriense
Flora of Ecuador
Vulnerable plants
Plants described in 1906
Taxonomy articles created by Polbot